Protobranchia is a subclass of bivalve molluscs.  It contains the extant orders Nuculanida, Nuculida, and Solemyida.

These are deep water clams of a small and primitive order with a taxodont hinge (composed of many similar, small teeth), generally with a central ligament pit, large labial palps which are used in deposit feeding and the gills used only for respiration, the anterior and posterior adductor muscles are nearly equal in size, a foot which is divided sagittally and longitudinally with papillate margins. The foot in Protobranchia clams is without a true byssus gland, although they frequently have a nonhomologous byssal gland in the heel. The byssal gland in these clams does not produce threads as in Pteriomorphia.

2010 Taxonomy 
In 2010 a new proposed classification system for the Bivalvia was published in by Bieler, Carter & Coan revising the classification of the Bivalvia, including the subclass Protobranchia.

Subclass: Protobranchia

Order: Nuculanida 
Superfamily: Nuculanoidea
Family: Bathyspinulidae
Family: Lametilidae accepted as Phaseolidae
Family: Malletiidae
Family: Neilonellidae
Family: Nuculanidae
Family: Siliculidae
Family: Tindariidae
Family: Yoldiidae

Order: Nuculida 
Superfamily: Nuculoidea
Family: Nuculidae
Family: Sareptidae

Order: Solemyida 
Superfamily: Manzanelloidea
Family: Manzanellidae
Family: Nucinellidae
Superfamily: Solemyoidea
Family: Solemyidae

Order: † Praecardiida 
Family: † Butovicellidae
Genus: † Butovicella
Family: † Praecardiidae
Genus: † Slava
Genus: † Cardiola
Family: † Antipleuridae
Genus: † Dualina
Genus: † Hercynella

References 

Bivalve taxonomy
Mollusc subclasses